Beer Nuts is an American brand of snack food building on the original product, peanuts with a sweet-and-salty glazing. According to the manufacturer, the ingredients include peanuts, coconut oil, corn syrup and salt. In the United States, Beer Nuts are a staple of bar snacks and are often referred to as "the quintessential American bar food". 

Although Beer Nuts do not contain any beer, the name suggests that they are intended as a side dish to beer consumption.

History
 The company began in 1937 when Edward Shirk and his son Arlo took over the Caramel Crisp confectionery store in Bloomington, Illinois, which sold a product called "Redskins," "slightly sweet, lightly salted" glazed peanuts with their red skins intact. Beginning in 1950, this product was sold packaged as "Shirk's Glazed Peanuts" in local liquor stores.

By 1953, local food distributor Eldredge C. Brewster helped expand the product to a national brand, and the Beer Nuts trademark was registered. By the 1960s, the product was available in all 50 states, and by the 1970s, the Shirks shipped 10 million pounds of Beer Nuts nationally. The company's product line has since expanded to other nuts, such as cashews and almonds, and various snack mixes, gift baskets and holiday packaged items.

The Beer Nuts brand has been registered as a trademark since 1955 and has been successfully protected in court on several occasions from competing brands who used similar names. Beer Nuts has been described as ”something of a case study in brands avoiding genericization”.

The company remains family owned with production still based in Bloomington, operating out of the 100,000-square-foot facility it relocated to in 1973.

Other countries
In Australia, beer nuts refers to salted roasted peanuts with the testa (red skin) intact. They are sold unglazed.

See also
 Cracker nuts
 List of brand name snack foods
 List of peanut dishes

References

External links
Official website

Brand name snack foods
Food manufacturers of the United States
Companies based in Bloomington–Normal
Products introduced in 1937